The Bong mine is a large iron mine located in central Liberia in Bong County. Bong represents one of the largest iron ore reserves in Liberia and in the world having estimated reserves of 4 billion tonnes of ore grading 36% iron metal.

References 

Iron mines in Liberia
Bong County